Bikaner is a city in Bikaner district of Rajasthan.

Bikaner may also refer to:

Bikaner district, the district in Rajasthan.
Bikaner division, one of the administrative geographical unit of Rajasthan.
Bikaner State, founded in the 15th century and persisted until shortly after India's Independence in 1947.
Bikaner House, princely house located in New Delhi.
Bikaner, village in Rewari district of Haryana.